Florentina da Conceição Pereira Martins Smith (born 9 September 1958) is an East Timorese politician, and a member of the Fretilin political party. Between September 2017 and June 2018, she was the Minister for Social Solidarity under the VII Constitutional Government of East Timor led by Mari Alkatiri. Previously, between 2012 and 2017, she was a member of the National Parliament of East Timor.

Early life and career
Martins Smith has a degree in Economics and Management. Prior to commencing her political career, she was the Inspector General of the Ministry of Tourism, Trade and Industry. She was also General Secretary of the Organização Popular de Mulheres Timorense OPMT, the women's division of Fretilin.

Political career
In the 2012 East Timorese parliamentary election, Martins Smith was elected to the National Parliament from 12th place on the Fretilin list. In the National Parliament, she was a member of the Public Finance Committee (Committee C).

In 2017, Martins Smith was re-elected to the National Parliament, once again from 12th place on the Fretilin list. However, on 15 September 2017 she was sworn in as Minister of Social Solidarity in the VII Constitutional Government, and therefore had to give up her seat in accordance with the Constitution. She left that office on 22 June 2018, upon the formation of the VIII Constitutional Government.

References

External links 

Fretilin politicians
Government ministers of East Timor
Living people
Women government ministers of East Timor
1958 births
21st-century East Timorese politicians